Minding the Gap is a 2018 documentary film directed by Bing Liu.  It was produced by Liu and Diane Moy Quon through Kartemquin Films. It chronicles the lives and friendships of three young men growing up in Rockford, Illinois, united by their love of skateboarding. The film received critical acclaim, winning the U.S. Documentary Special Jury Award for Breakthrough Filmmaking at the Sundance Film Festival, and was nominated for Best Documentary Feature at the 91st Academy Awards.

Summary
Bing Liu lives in Rockford, Illinois. He has two friends he met through skateboarding: Keire Johnson and Zack Mulligan. As they reach adulthood, Zack becomes a father and stops skating in order to become a roofer and support his family. Keire supports himself with a job as a dishwasher.

Over the course of the film all three friends reveal that they grew up in abusive homes. Zack and his partner Nina begin to have difficulties in their relationship and Bing learns that Zack has been abusive towards Nina. A venture to create an indoor skatepark falls apart and Zack is left with fewer options. Nina repeatedly leaves him.

Keire becomes a waiter and focuses on trying to educate himself. He grows apart from Zack and finds himself chafing against the racism of the town which even comes from his friends. Though his father was abusive he finds himself reflecting on positive memories of their relationship and the ways in which his father influenced him.

Zack finally separates from Nina for good and the two have a contentious relationship with Nina filing for child support after he abruptly leaves the state. He eventually returns and slides further into alcoholism, struggling with how his decisions might affect his young son.

Keire finally earns enough money to move to Denver.

A post-script reveals that Nina is pursuing a degree, Zack has been promoted at work and Keire has been successful in Denver pursuing both his educational goals and a career as a professional skateboarder.

Release
The film premiered at the 2018 Sundance Film Festival and received the U.S. Documentary Special Jury Award for Breakthrough Filmmaking. In June 2018, Hulu acquired the distribution rights, and it was released theatrically and on Hulu on August 17, 2018. It aired on PBS on February 18, 2019, as part of the network's POV series.

In 2021, a special edition of Minding the Gap was released by The Criterion Collection.

Reception
Minding the Gap is Liu's first feature film. A. O. Scott of the New York Times called it an "astonishing debut feature" and "a rich, devastating essay on race, class and manhood in 21st-century America." Sophie Gilbert of The Atlantic called it "an extraordinary feat of filmmaking." Richard Brody of The New Yorker wrote that the images of skateboarding "are merely the background and context for the film," whose "substance—domestic trauma, systemic racism, and economic dislocation—is also the very stuff of society, and the near-at-hand intimacy gives rise to a film of vast scope and political depth." The site's consensus reads: "Minding the Gap draws on more than a decade of documentary footage to assemble a poignant picture of young American lives that resonates far beyond its onscreen subjects." It also holds a 90/100 average on Metacritic. Former U.S. President and Illinoisian Barack Obama cited the film as one of his favorites of 2018.

Accolades
The film was nominated for an Independent Spirit Award for Best Documentary Feature and the Truer Than Fiction Award. It was nominated for five Critics' Choice Awards, and was named one of the Top Documentaries by the National Board of Review. It won a 2018 Peabody Award, and won the New York Film Critics Circle award for Best Non-Fiction Film. After being shortlisted, Minding the Gap was nominated for the Academy Award for Best Documentary Feature at the 91st Academy Awards.

See also 
 List of films with a 100% rating on Rotten Tomatoes

References

External links 
 
 
 
 
 
Minding the Gap: What It’s About an essay by Jay Caspian Kang at the Criterion Collection

2018 films
2018 documentary films
American documentary films
Kartemquin Films films
Hulu original films
Films set in Illinois
Culture of Rockford, Illinois
Skateboarding films
Sundance Film Festival award winners
2018 independent films
Documentary films about Illinois
2010s English-language films
2010s American films